The 2007–08 Indiana Pacers season was Indiana's 41st season as a franchise and 32nd season in the NBA. The Pacers finished the regular season with a record of 36–46 and missed the playoffs, for the second straight season.

Offseason

Draft picks
Indiana did not have a draft pick, but did pull off a Draft Day trade for the rights to Stanko Barać with the Miami Heat.

Roster

Regular season

Season standings

Record vs. opponents

Game log

October 
Record: 1–0; Home: 1–0; Road: 0–0

November 
Record: 7–9; Home: 3–5; Road: 4–4

December 
Record: 7–8; Home: 3–3; Road: 4–5

January 
Record: 4–10; Home: 2–3; Road: 2–7

February 
Record: 4–9; Home: 2–7; Road: 2–2

March 
Record: 8–7; Home: 7–1; Road: 1–6

April 
Record: 5–3; Home: 3–1; Road: 2–2

 Green background indicates win.
 Red background indicates loss.

Player stats

Regular season 

*Total for entire season including previous team(s)

Awards and records

Records

Milestones

Transactions
The Pacers have been involved in the following transactions during the 2007–08 season.

Trades

Free agents

See also
 2007–08 NBA season

Indiana Pacers seasons
2007–08 NBA season by team
Pace
Pace